The 2021 Saint Petersburg Challenger II was a professional tennis tournament played on hard courts. It was the second edition of the tournament which was part of the 2021 ATP Challenger Tour. It took place in Saint Petersburg, Russia between 8 and 14  March 2021.

Singles main-draw entrants

Seeds

1 Rankings as of 1 March 2021.

Other entrants
The following players received wildcards into the singles main draw:
  Evgenii Tiurnev
  Vaja Uzakov
  Denis Yevseyev

The following player received entry into the singles main draw as a special exempt:
  Zizou Bergs

The following players received entry into the singles main draw as alternates:
  Jesper de Jong
  Michael Vrbenský

The following players received entry from the qualifying draw:
  Mirza Bašić
  Jiří Lehečka
  Matija Pecotić
  Tim van Rijthoven

Champions

Singles

 Evgenii Tiurnev def.  Kacper Żuk 6–4, 6–2.

Doubles

 Jesper de Jong /  Sem Verbeek def.  Konstantin Kravchuk /  Denis Yevseyev 6–1, 3–6, [10–5].

References

2021 ATP Challenger Tour
2021 in Russian tennis
March 2021 sports events in Russia